The Northern Colorado Bears football program is the intercollegiate American football team for the University of Northern Colorado located in Greeley, Colorado. The team competes in the Big Sky Conference at the NCAA Division I Football Championship Subdivision (FCS) level. The university's first football team was fielded in 1893. The team plays its home games at the 8,533 seat Nottingham Field on campus. The Bears announced the hiring of Ed Lamb on December 6th, 2022,  replacing Ed McCaffrey, who went 6–16 in two seasons.

Conference affiliations
Below is the list of conferences in which Northern Colorado has been a member.
 Rocky Mountain Athletic Conference (1923–1971)
 Great Plains Athletic Conference (1972–1975)
 NCAA Division II independent (1976–1979)
 North Central Conference (1980–2002) 
 Great West Football Conference (2004–2005)
 Big Sky Conference (2006–present)

Championships

National championships 
Northern Colorado made two appearances in the NCAA Division II National Championship Game. The Bears defeated Carson–Newman, 23–14 in 1996, and later defeated New Haven, 51–0 in 1997.

Conference championships

† Co-champions

Division championships

Playoff appearances (NCAA Division II)
The Bears have appeared in the NCAA Division II playoffs nine times with an overall record of 12–7.

Attendance

Highest attendance

Below is a list of the Bears best-attended home games at Nottingham Field.

As of the 2014 season.

Yearly attendance

Source:

Below is the Bears home attendance by season at Nottingham Field.

As of the 2015 season.

Notable former players
Notable alumni include:
 Reed Doughty
 Vincent Jackson
 Dirk Johnson
 Jeff Knapple
 Bill Kenney
 Corte McGuffey
 Brad Pyatt
 Tony Ramirez
 Aaron Smith
 Loren Snyder
 Dave Stalls
 Frank Wainright
 Jed Roberts
 Herve Tonye-Tonye
 Cedric Tillman 
 Brian Scott
 Kyle Sloter

Move to the Football Championship Subdivision (FCS) 
Since moving to the Big Sky Conference in the Football Championship Subdivision (FCS) from Division II in 2006 the bears have struggled compiling 
a conference win - loss record of 28 and 100 as of the 2022 Season.

References

External links
 

 
American football teams established in 1893
1893 establishments in Colorado